Ops may refer to:

 Ops − a Roman goddess in the ancient Roman religion
 Ops (mythology) − figures in Greek mythology
 Extreme Ops − a 2002 action thriller film, directed by Christian Duguay
 DevOps − in the information technology
 "Black ops" − black operations
 "Spec Ops" − special operations in the military
 Spec Ops − a series of tactical shooter video games:
Spec Ops: Rangers Lead the Way (1998)
Spec Ops: Ranger Team Bravo (1998)
Spec Ops II: Green Berets (1999)
Spec Ops II: Operation Bravo (2000)
Spec Ops II: Omega Squad (2000) (Dreamcast)
Spec Ops: Stealth Patrol (2000)
Spec Ops: Ranger Elite (2001)
Spec Ops: Covert Assault (2001)
Spec Ops: Airborne Commando (2002)
Spec Ops: The Line (2012)

See also
 OP (disambiguation)
 OPS (disambiguation)
 OOPS (disambiguation)
 Black Ops (disambiguation)